Khamphoui Keoboualapha (born 13 June 1930) was a Laotian politician and member of the Lao People's Revolutionary Party.

He served as the First Secretary of the LPRP Champasak Provincial Committee in 1974–76, Minister of Economic, Planning and Finance in 1991 and served as a Deputy Prime Minister.

He was elected to the LPRP Central Committee at the 4th National Congress and retained a seat on the body until the 6th National Congress.

References

Specific

Bibliography
Books:
 

Living people
1930 births
Members of the 4th Central Committee of the Lao People's Revolutionary Party
Members of the 5th Central Committee of the Lao People's Revolutionary Party
Members of the 5th Politburo of the Lao People's Revolutionary Party
Deputy Prime Ministers of Laos
Finance Ministers of Laos
Government ministers of Laos
Lao People's Revolutionary Party politicians
Place of birth missing (living people)